Anncar is an unincorporated community in Holt County, Nebraska, United States.

History
A post office was established in Anncar in 1900, and remained in operation until being discontinued in 1931. Anncar is the portmanteau of the name of a settler, Ann Carroll.

References

Unincorporated communities in Holt County, Nebraska
Unincorporated communities in Nebraska